Santa Laura may refer to:

Buildings
 Estadio Santa Laura (stadium)
 Humberstone and Santa Laura Saltpeter Works (refineries)
 Santa Laura (abbey)

Other
 Saint Laura (Christian martyr)